Luke Robert Laird is an  American country music songwriter and producer. This article lists all of the songs that he has had a hand in writing as well as those that he has produced.

Songwriting discography

Production discography

Albums

Songs

References

Country music discographies
Discographies of American artists